Gibson, Dunn & Crutcher LLP is an American multinational law firm headquartered in Los Angeles, California. Founded in 1890, the firm includes approximately 1,400 attorneys and 1,000 staff located in 20 offices around the world, including North and South America, Europe, Asia, and the Middle East. The firm is known for its litigation practice, and in particular its strength in appellate law.

History
The firm was founded in May 1890 by Republican corporate attorney John Bicknel and Democratic litigator Walter Trask. In 1897, Judge James Gibson joined the firm. Six years later, the firm merged with another law firm, belonging to former Los Angeles city attorney William Ellsworth Dunn and assistant city attorney Albert Crutcher. The merger gave the firm its name, which it still uses today.

In 2009, Theodore B. Olson, a partner of the firm, successfully argued the case Citizens United v. FEC in its favor. The verdict sanctioned businesses' limitless campaign spending, which promoted corruption and black money.

Gibson Dunn is also actively involved in homeless encampments-related cases. In 2020, during the COVID-19 pandemic, the firm represented West Side Community Organization (Westco), an organization that advocated for the relocation of homeless persons from Upper West Side to a downtown hotel in the wake of the COVID-19 outbreak. Randy Mastro, a partner of the firm, who represented it was criticized for taking up the lawsuit and his home was vandalized as a protest in October 2020.

Gibson Dunn has also defended Chevron in court against Steven Donziger, the attorney who won the $8.6 billion judgement against Chevron in Aguinda v. Texaco, Inc. for the company's dumping of toxic oil waste in Ecuador. To counter Donziger, the firm has employed private investigators to follow him, publishing a periodical to defame him, and use of hundreds of lawyers to fight against him. As a result Donziger has faced fines and increased legal costs.

Notable cases
The firm is best known for its litigation practice, which has been named the top "Litigation Department of the Year" in the United States by The American Lawyer in several biannual rankings, most recently in 2020. The firm is also known for its land use and real estate practices. The firm's attorneys have argued more than 100 cases before the United States Supreme Court.

Some of the firm's notable cases include:
 The firm is representing Chevron in its long-running, $27 billion environmental dispute in Ecuador. According to The Intercept, Gibson Dunn has hired private investigators to track Steven Donziger and created "a team of hundreds of lawyers to fight him". This resulted in a boycott launched in April 2021 by the student group Law Students for Climate Accountability.
 The firm represented George W. Bush in Bush v. Gore, the litigation contesting certification of Florida's results in the 2000 United States presidential election. Theodore Olsen, the partner who argued the case for Bush in the Supreme Court, went on to serve as solicitor general in the Bush administration.
 The firm represented Apple, Inc. in its patent infringement suit against Samsung (Apple v. Samsung) relating to the Galaxy Nexus smartphone, and won an injunction in June 2012 blocking the sale of the Galaxy Nexus phone in the United States. The injunction was vacated in October 2012 based on the results of the trial. It also represented Apple in Epic Games v. Apple, a lawsuit related to Apple's practices in the App Store and the removal of  Fortnite from the App Store.
 The firm is representing Mark Zuckerberg, founder of Facebook, in a $17 billion contract dispute with purported seed money financier Paul Ceglia.
 The firm is defending Intel against several multibillion-dollar antitrust lawsuits filed by AMD and the European Union.
 The firm is representing CNN in its lawsuit against President Trump and many of his staff on the basis of Jim Acosta's right to a "hard pass", a clearance to enter the White House.
 The firm is representing the Dole Food Company in a multibillion-dollar toxic tort suit in Nicaragua involving allegations of farmworker sterility stemming from Dole's use of certain pesticides.  After the firm uncovered substantial evidence of fraud and a conspiracy between the plaintiffs and Nicaraguan judges to extort Dole out of billions with manufactured claims, courts in the United States dismissed multiple related suits against Dole and refused to enforce several Nicaraguan judgments.
 In 2009, the firm represented NBC Universal in its contract dispute with Conan O'Brien.
 The firm represented Viacom in its billion-dollar copyright infringement lawsuit against Google and YouTube in Viacom International Inc. v. YouTube, Inc. After multiple rulings at the District Court and Appellate Court, the case was settled in 2014.
Governor Chris Christie hired Gibson Dunn attorney Randy Mastro to conduct an internal investigation of the circumstances surrounding the Fort Lee lane closure scandal and representing the Governor in a later federal investigation. The firm was later criticized by U.S. District Judge Susan Wigenton for its methods of record keeping, and accused the firm of "opacity and gamesmanship."
 Gibson Dunn provided advice to the private prosecutor responsible for conducting the criminal contempt case against Steven Donziger. Since Gibson Dunn also acts for Chevron, The Nation wrote that the collaboration raised issues of fairness.
 Gibson Dunn is representing the plaintiffs in Haaland v. Brackeen pro bono in seeking to overturn the Indian Child Welfare Act.  This has led to accusations that Gibson Dunn is seeking to weaken federal protections for Native American tribes overall, opening the way for corporate exploitation of natural resources or Native American gaming.

Notable transactions
 The firm has represented tobacco companies.
The firm advised Hewlett-Packard in its £7 billion bid for Autonomy Corporation.
 The firm advised Kraft in its $19.7 billion bid for Cadbury.
 Gibson attorneys advised Heineken in its $7.6 billion buyout of Mexican brewing conglomerate FEMSA.

Political contributions
According to OpenSecrets, Gibson Dunn was one of the top law firms contributing to federal candidates during the 2012 election cycle, donating $1.45 million, 55% to Democrats. Since 1990, Gibson Dunn contributed $6.15 million to federal campaigns.

Controversy 
In an article published by the Amazon Defense Coalition FDA, on August 15, 2018, on the digital media platform Corporate Social Responsibility wire it stated:

"The law firm engaged in practices based on the Gibson Dunn marketing playbook which involves what the firm calls the “kill step” to defeat the enforcement in the U.S. of civil money judgements obtained from foreign courts.The article states: The “kill step” usually involves accusing opposing counsel of “fraud” and other misconduct to try to intimidate them into withdrawing, thereby leaving the corporation's victims defenseless and unable to continue with their cases."

In 2007, the Montana Supreme Court found that Gibson Dunn "acted with actual malice" in suing an art expert Steve Seltzer, who said that a painting signed by Charles Marion Russell was actually created by his grandfather Olaf Carl Seltzer, thus reducing its value. The Supreme Court said "GDC's use of the judicial system amounts to legal thuggery" and found that Gibson Dunn "blatantly and maliciously tried to intimidate Seltzer with the apparent power, prestige, and resources of a large, nationally prominent law firm coupled with an ominous lawsuit that they knew threatened to ruin and devastate him professionally, personally, and financially".

Gibson Dunn has been accused of unethical litigation tactics, and has been covered in the legal press for facing nearly one-million dollars in punitive sanction fees for facilitating discovery misconduct by Facebook. Gibson Dunn, defending Facebook for its illegal disclosure of data to Cambridge Analytica, engaged in objective "bad faith" and continued to do so notwithstanding federal judge Vincent Chhabria's discussion that Gibson Dunn should behave more ethically.

Gibson Dunn's pro bono efforts in the Brackeen v. Haaland case have been questioned. Gibson Dunn is attempting to repeal a landmark law supported by Native Americans. Matthew McGill, a partner at the firm, has argued that the Indian Child Welfare Act discriminates against non-Native People who wish to adopt Native children.

Notable attorneys and staff
Richard Bierschbach, Dean of Wayne State University Law School
Preet Bharara, former U.S. Attorney for the Southern District of New York from 2009 to 2017.
Robert C. Bonner, former Administrator of the U.S. Drug Enforcement Administration.
David W. Burcham, former president of Loyola Marymount University
Aileen Cannon, United States District Court for the Southern District of Florida.
Tom Cotton, former associate and current U.S. Senator.
Michael J. Desmond, 48th Chief Counsel of the Internal Revenue Service.
Miguel Estrada, U.S. Supreme Court practitioner and former nominee to the U.S. Court of Appeals for the D.C. Circuit.
George J. Hazel, Judge for the United States District Court for the District of Maryland. 
James C. Ho, Judge of the U.S. Court of Appeals for the Fifth Circuit. 
Theodore Olson, former United States Solicitor General from 2001 to 2004 under President George W. Bush.
Kelly Perdew, former associate and reality television star on The Apprentice.
Jennifer H. Rearden, United States District Court for the Southern District of New York
Eugene Scalia, former Solicitor for the U.S. Department of Labor and former United States Secretary of Labor in the Donald Trump administration.
Benjamin B. Wagner, former U.S. Attorney for the Eastern District of California from 2009 to 2016.
Debra Wong Yang, former L.A. Superior Court Judge and U.S. Attorney for the Central District of California.

See also
List of largest law firms by profits per partner

References

External links
 

Law firms based in Los Angeles
Law firms established in 1890
Foreign law firms with offices in Hong Kong